Shooting Star is a short film co-produced between Bulgaria and Italy starring Stefka Yanorova, Stefan Popov and Kalia Kamenova written and directed by Lyubo Yonchev.

Synopsis
Lilly is a divorced mother of two – Martin, who has recently come of age, and the little Alexandra. One cold winter evening Martin takes Alexandra from kindergarten. In the dark streets of the neighborhood they become a part of a tragic accident that hardly can be forgotten or erased. Lilly and her kids have to make tough decisions, the consequences of which will change their life for good.

External links
 
 

2015 films
Bulgarian short films
Italian short films
2015 short films
Bulgarian drama films
2010s Bulgarian-language films
2015 drama films